Stephen E. Levin (born June 3, 1932) is a former Democratic member of the Pennsylvania House of Representatives.
He earned a BS in Economics in 1953 and an LLB in 1958 from The University of Pennsylvania. He served in the US Army from 1953 to 1955.

Levin was first elected on November 8, 1977 and served five terms, ending with the 1985-86 session. He later served as a Judge of Common Pleas in Philadelphia County.

References

1932 births
Living people
Judges of the Pennsylvania Courts of Common Pleas
Democratic Party members of the Pennsylvania House of Representatives
Politicians from Philadelphia